Charlie Mark Cameron (born 5 July 1994) is a professional Australian rules footballer playing for the Brisbane Lions in the Australian Football League (AFL). He previously played for the Adelaide Football Club from 2014 to 2017. Cameron was taken with pick 7 in the 2013 rookie draft by Adelaide.

Early life
Cameron was born in Mount Isa, Queensland into an Aboriginal Australian family (Lardil and Waanyi). He attended primary school in Mornington Island, Queensland before moving to Brisbane to board at Marist College Ashgrove. As a schoolboy he played baseball, rugby union and rugby league at high levels. He also played several games of Australian rules football while attending Marist College and spent six months in the Brisbane Lions Talent Academy before quitting football to focus on rugby. Following graduation in late 2011, at the age of 17, Cameron moved with his family to Newman, Western Australia. His brother, Jarrod, is also a professional Australian rules footballer playing for the West Coast Eagles.

Pre-AFL career
While in Newman, Cameron was talked into playing for the local football team, the Newman Saints. He began playing club football for the first time for the Saints in 2012 and impressed so much that, towards the end of the season, he was invited to play for the Swan Districts Football Club and played three colts games. Entering his first pre-season ever with Swan Districts in 2013, he impressed the coaches so much that he earned a spot in the senior team for the first round of the 2013 WAFL season, and represented Western Australia at the 2013 AFL Under 18 Championships, which led to him being picked up by Adelaide in the rookie draft despite only having played a total of 30-40 games of Australian rules football.

AFL career
Cameron showed excellent form in the SANFL early in his first season, and was rewarded with a promotion to the senior list, replacing the injured Nathan van Berlo. He made his debut in round 9 against , kicking a goal and evading a tackle to set up another. Cameron went on to play seven AFL games in 2014 despite battling a groin injury, kicking nine goals including a bag of three against  in round 12. At the end of the season he won the Crows' Mark Bickley Emerging Talent Award.

Cameron cemented his place in Adelaide's best 22 in 2015, playing 22 games for 29 goals and 17 goal assists.

He had another impressive performance the next week in Sir Doug Nicholls Indigenous Round, kicking three goals against Fremantle in a 100-point win. In October 2017, Cameron requested a trade home to Queensland with Brisbane being his preferred destination despite being contracted to Adelaide until the end of the 2018 season. He was officially traded to Brisbane during the trade period.

After helping the Brisbane Lions to reach the finals from 2019 to 2022, he had gained a reputation for his ferocious efforts in front of goal. His finest hour came in the semi final of the 2022 AFL season against the Melbourne Demons, when he marked the ball in the dying minutes of the game  just inside the boundary line and converted the set shot to set up the Brisbane Lions for a miracle win against the reigning premiers.

Statistics
Updated to the end of the 2022 season.

|- 
| 2014 ||  || 42
| 7 || 9 || 10 || 36 || 26 || 62 || 11 || 24 || 1.3 || 1.4 || 5.1 || 3.7 || 8.9 || 1.6 || 3.4 || 0
|-
| 2015 ||  || 23
| 22 || 29 || 24 || 151 || 74 || 225 || 61 || 62 || 1.3 || 1.1 || 6.9 || 3.4 || 10.2 || 2.8 || 2.8 || 0
|- 
| 2016 ||  || 23
| 20 || 20 || 18 || 174 || 94 || 268 || 56 || 87 || 1.0 || 0.9 || 8.7 || 4.7 || 13.4 || 2.8 || 4.4 || 0
|-
| 2017 ||  || 23
| 24 || 29 || 25 || 227 || 107 || 334 || 67 || 103 || 1.2 || 1.0 || 9.5 || 4.5 || 13.9 || 2.8 || 4.3 || 0
|- 
| 2018 ||  || 23
| 11 || 17 || 4 || 104 || 37 || 141 || 47 || 27 || 1.5 || 0.4 || 9.5 || 3.4 || 12.8 || 4.3 || 2.5 || 0
|-
| 2019 ||  || 23
| 24 || 57 || 32 || 217 || 78 || 295 || 81 || 49 || 2.4 || 1.3 || 9.0 || 3.3 || 12.3 || 3.4 || 2.0 || 11
|- 
| 2020 ||  || 23
| 19 || 32 || 22 || 139 || 38 || 177 || 64 || 42 || 1.6 || 1.2 || 8.2 || 2.6 || 9.3 || 3.4 || 2.2 || 1
|-
| 2021 ||  || 23
| 24 || 55 || 33 || 199 || 62 || 261 || 95 || 53 || 2.3 || 1.4 || 8.3 || 2.6 || 10.9 || 4.0 || 2.2 || 1
|- 
| 2022 ||  || 23
| 25 || 54 || 21 || 201 || 84 || 285 || 96 || 77 || 2.1 || 0.8 || 8.0 || 3.3 || 11.4 || 3.8 || 3.0 || 3
|- class=sortbottom
! colspan=3 | Career
! 176 !! 301 !! 189 !! 1448 !! 600 !! 2048 !! 578 !! 522 !! 1.7 !! 1.0 !! 8.2 !! 3.4 !! 11.6 !! 3.2 !! 2.9 !! 16
|}

Notes

Honours and achievements
Individual
 All-Australian team: 2019
 4× Brisbane Lions leading goalkicker: 2019 (57), 2020 (32), 2021 (55), 2022 (54)
 All Stars Representative Honours in Bushfire Relief Match: 2020
 Marcus Ashcroft Medal: 2019 (round 21)
 AFL Rising Star nominee: 2015 (round 13)

References

External links

1994 births
Living people
People from Mount Isa
Swan Districts Football Club players
Australian rules footballers from Queensland
Adelaide Football Club players
Brisbane Lions players
Indigenous Australian players of Australian rules football
Adelaide Football Club (SANFL) players
All-Australians (AFL)